Melica imperfecta is a species of grass known by the common name smallflower melic and little California melic.

It is native to the Arizona, California, and Nevada in the United States and Baja California in Mexico. It grows in chaparral, woodlands, montane regions, and other dry areas.

Description
The inflorescence is a narrow or spreading series of spikelets which are green in color with areas of purple.

Cultivation
Melica imperfecta is cultivated in the specialty horticulture trade and available as an ornamental grass for: natural landscape, native plant, drought tolerant water conserving, and habitat gardens.

External links
Jepson Manual Treatment — Melica imperfecta
Grass Manual Treatment
Melica imperfecta — U.C. Photo gallery

imperfecta
Bunchgrasses of North America
Grasses of the United States
Native grasses of California
Grasses of Mexico
Flora of Arizona
Flora of Baja California
Flora of Nevada
Flora of the California desert regions
Flora of the Sierra Nevada (United States)
Natural history of the California chaparral and woodlands
Natural history of the California Coast Ranges
Natural history of the Mojave Desert
Natural history of the Peninsular Ranges
Natural history of the San Francisco Bay Area
Natural history of the Santa Monica Mountains
Natural history of the Transverse Ranges
Garden plants of North America
Drought-tolerant plants
Flora without expected TNC conservation status